The 2011 St. George Illawarra Dragons season was the 13th in the joint venture club's history. Coached by Wayne Bennett and captained by Ben Hornby they competed in the NRL's 2011 Telstra Premiership as defending champions. The Dragons finished the regular season 5th (out of 16) before being knocked out of the finals by the Brisbane Broncos. This was Bennett's last match with the Dragons as he moved to the Newcastle Knights for the 2012 NRL season.

Pre Season
In the pre-season the Dragons won their annual Charity Shield match against South Sydney before travelling to take on reigning Super League champions, Wigan Warriors.

The Dragons won all three of their pre-season games. This included victory in the 2011 World Club Challenge, giving them the title of best club rugby league team in the world.

Regular season
By the middle of the regular season the Dragons were leading the competition.

Finals

Ladder

Squad

Transfers
Gains

Losses

References

St. George Illawarra Dragons seasons
St. George Illawarra Dragons season